Nieves Fernández Mata (born 19 October 1968 in Leon) is a Spanish sport shooter. She competed in rifle shooting events at the 1992 Summer Olympics.

Olympic results

References

1968 births
Living people
ISSF rifle shooters
Spanish female sport shooters
Shooters at the 1992 Summer Olympics
Olympic shooters of Spain
Sportspeople from León, Spain
20th-century Spanish women